NK Podravac is a Croatian football club based in Virje municipality.

Honours 

 Treća HNL – North:
Winners (1): 2000–01

Football clubs in Croatia
Football clubs in Koprivnica-Križevci County
Association football clubs established in 1908
1908 establishments in Croatia